is a professional Japanese baseball player. He plays pitcher for the Tohoku Rakuten Golden Eagles.

External links

 NPB.com

1988 births
Japanese baseball players
Living people
Nippon Professional Baseball pitchers
People from Chita, Aichi
Baseball people from Aichi Prefecture
Tohoku Rakuten Golden Eagles players
Yomiuri Giants players